The 2005 South American Rugby Championship "B" was the sixth edition of the competition of the second level national Rugby Union teams in South America.

The tournament was played in Asuncion, on the ground of the Club Universitario de Rugby de Asunción (CURDA), called "Julio Alvarodo", with five team participating.

Paraguay won  the tournament.

Standings 

 Three point for victory, two for draw, and one for lost 
{| class="wikitable"
|-
!width=165|Team
!width=40|Played
!width=40|Won
!width=40|Drawn
!width=40|Lost
!width=40|For
!width=40|Against
!width=40|Difference
!width=40|Pts
|- bgcolor=#ccffcc align=center
|align=left| 
|4||4||0||0||289||26||+ 263||12
|- align=center
|align=left| 
|4||3||0||1||130||71||+ 59||10
|- align=center
|align=left| 
|4||2||0||2||54||141||- 87||8
|- align=center
|align=left| 
|4||1||0||3||48||170||- 122||6
|- align=center
|align=left| 
|4||0||0||4||45||158||- 113||4
|}

Results  
 First Round

 Second Round

 Third Round

 Fourth Round

 Fifth Round

References

2005
2005 rugby union tournaments for national teams
B
rugby union
rugby union
rugby union
rugby union
rugby union
International rugby union competitions hosted by Paraguay